This is the British Expeditionary Force order of battle on 9 May 1940, the day before the German forces initiated the Battle of France.

High-level order of battle

First Expeditionary Force
 General John Vereker, 6th Viscount Gort
 5th Infantry Division (Major-General Harold Franklyn)
  I Corps (Lieutenant-General Michael Barker)
 1st Infantry Division (Major-General Harold Rupert Leofric George Alexander)
 2nd Infantry Division (Major-General Henry Charles Loyd)
 48th (South Midland) Infantry Division (Major-General Augustus Francis Andrew Nicol Thorne)
  II Corps (Lieutenant-General Alan Brooke)
 3rd Infantry Division (Major-General Bernard Montgomery)
 4th Infantry Division (Major-General Dudley Johnson)
 50th (Northumbrian) Motor Infantry Division (Major-General Giffard Martel)
  III Corps (Lieutenant-General Sir Ronald Forbes Adam
 42nd (East Lancashire) Infantry Division (Major-General William Holmes)
 44th (Home Counties) Infantry Division (Major-General Edmund Osborne)
 Saar Force (Major-General Victor Fortune)
 51st (Highland) Infantry Division (Major-General V. M. Fortune)
 Formations undergoing training and performing labour duties
 HQ Lines of Communication British Expeditionary Force (Major-General Philip de Fonblanque)
 Units arriving in France after 10 May 1940
Other formations
 Air Component
 Second Expeditionary Force

First Expeditionary Force

General Headquarters (GHQ)
 General Officer Commanding-in-Chief: General John Vereker, 6th Viscount Gort
 Chief of the General Staff: Lieutenant-General Sir Henry Royds Pownall
 Adjutant General: Lieutenant-General Sir W. D. S. Brownrigg
 Quartermaster General: Lieutenant-General W. G. Lindsell
 Deputy Chief of the General Staff; Major-General Philip Neame
 Major-General Royal Artillery: Major-General Sydney Rigby Wason
 Engineer-in-Chief: Major-General Ridley Pakenham-Walsh

GHQ, British Expeditionary Force Headquarters Troops 

 GHQ-attached units
 Intelligence Section, Intelligence Corps
 General Headquarters Signals, Royal Signals
 2nd Wireless Company, Royal Signals
 100th Special Wireless Section (Providing support for GHQ)
 101st Special Wireless Section (Providing support for I Corps)
 102nd Special Wireless Section (Providing support for II Corps)
 103rd Special Wireless Section (Providing support for III Corps)
 1st Air Formation Signals, Royal Signals
 2nd Air Formation Signals, Royal Signals
 1st Air Liaison Signals Section Royal Signals
 4th Air Liaison Signals Section Royal Signals
 6th Air Liaison Signals Section Royal Signals
 7th Air Liaison Signals Section Royal Signals
 12th (The Prince of Wales's) Royal Lancers
 1st Battalion, Welsh Guards
 7th Battalion, Cheshire Regiment (Machine-Guns)
 14th Battalion, Royal Fusiliers (City of London Regiment) (company size) - garrison unit
 8th Battalion, Middlesex Regiment (Duke of Cambridge's Own) (Machine-Guns)
 9th Overseas Defence Battalion, West Yorkshire Regiment (Prince of Wales's Own) - garrison unit
 6th (Argyllshire) Battalion, Argyll and Sutherland Highlanders (Princess Louises's Own) (Machine-Guns)
 6th Battalion, King's Own Royal Regiment (Lancaster) (Pioneers)
 7th Battalion, King's Own Royal Regiment (Lancaster) (Pioneers)
 8th Battalion, King's Own Royal Regiment (Lancaster) (Pioneers)
 6th Battalion, South Staffordshire Regiment (Pioneers)
 5th Movement Control Group Royal Engineers
 2nd Advanced Medical Depot, Royal Army Medical Corps
 4th Advanced Medical Depot, Royal Army Medical Corps
 9th Field Hygiene Section, Royal Army Medical Corps
 2nd Casualty Clearing Station, Royal Army Medical Corps
 3rd Casualty Clearing Station, Royal Army Medical Corps
 9th Casualty Clearing Station, Royal Army Medical Corps
 11th Casualty Clearing Station, Royal Army Medical Corps
 13th Casualty Clearing Station, Royal Army Medical Corps
 4th Motor Ambulance Convoy, Royal Army Medical Corps
 5th Motor Ambulance Convoy, Royal Army Medical Corps
 6th Motor Ambulance Convoy, Royal Army Medical Corps
 8th Motor Ambulance Convoy, Royal Army Medical Corps
 2nd Field Security Police Section Royal Military Police
 6th Field Security Police Section Royal Military Police
 30th Field Security Police Section Royal Military Police
 33rd Field Security Police Section Royal Military Police

 Headquarters, G.H.Q. Troops, Royal Army Service Corps
 1st G.H.Q. Troops Company, Royal Army Service Corps
 2nd G.H.Q. Troops Company, Royal Army Service Corps
 3rd G.H.Q. Troops Company, Royal Army Service Corps
 1st Lines of Communication Railhead Company, Royal Army Service Corps
 2nd Lines of Communication Railhead Company, Royal Army Service Corps
 2nd Supply Personnel Company, Royal Army Service Corps
 3rd Petrol Depot, Royal Army Service Corps
 1st Troop Carrying Company, Royal Army Service Corps
 2nd Troop Carrying Company, Royal Army Service Corps
 3rd Troop Carrying Company, Royal Army Service Corps
 4th Troop Carrying Company, Royal Army Service Corps
 9th Troop Carrying Company, Royal Army Service Corps
 13th Troop Carrying Company, Royal Army Service Corps
 14th Troop Carrying Company, Royal Army Service Corps
 1st Motor Transport Works Services Company, Royal Army Service Corps
 2nd Motor Transport Works Services Company, Royal Army Service Corps
 3rd Motor Transport Works Services Company, Royal Army Service Corps
 4th Motor Transport Works Services Company, Royal Army Service Corps

Armoured Brigades 
 1st Light Armoured Reconnaissance Brigade
 Brigade manning armoured cars
 1st Light Armoured Reconnaissance Brigade Headquarters and Signals Section, Royal Signals
 1st Fife and Forfar Yeomanry
 1st East Riding of Yorkshire Lancers
 2nd Light Armoured Reconnaissance Brigade
 Brigade manning armoured cars
 2nd Light Armoured Reconnaissance Brigade Headquarters and Signals Section, Royal Signals
 5th (Royal Inniskilling) Dragoon Guards
 15th/19th (The King's) Royal Hussars
 1st Army Tank Brigade
 Brigade manning infantry and cavalry tank
 1st Army Tank Brigade Headquarters and Signals Section, Royal Signals
 4th Royal Tank Regiment
 7th Royal Tank Regiment

Commander Royal Artillery 

 Direct reports
 1st Medium Regiment, Royal Artillery
 2nd Medium Regiment, Royal Artillery
 4th Medium Regiment, Royal Artillery
 58th (Suffolk) Medium Regiment, Royal Artillery
 61st Carnarvon and Denbigh (Yeomanry) Medium Regiment, Royal Artillery
 63rd (Midland) Medium Regiment, Royal Artillery
 65th (Highland) Medium Regiment, Royal Artillery
 1st Heavy Regiment, Royal Artillery
 51st (Lowland) Heavy Regiment, Royal Artillery
 52nd (Bedfordshire Yeomanry) Heavy Regiment, Royal Artillery
 1st Super-Heavy Regiment, Royal Artillery
 2nd Super-Heavy Regiment, Royal Artillery
 3rd Super-Heavy Regiment, Royal Artillery

 1st Anti-Aircraft Brigade
 1st Anti-Aircraft Brigade Headquarters and Signals Section, Royal Signals
 1st Anti-Aircraft Regiment, Royal Artillery
 6th Anti-Aircraft Regiment, Royal Artillery
 85th (Tees) Anti-Aircraft Regiment, Royal Artillery

 2nd Anti-Aircraft Brigade
 2nd Anti-Aircraft Brigade Headquarters and Signals Section, Royal Signals
 60th (City of London) Anti-Aircraft Regiment Royal Artillery
 51st (Devon) Light Anti-Aircraft Regiment Royal Artillery
 58th (Argyll and Sutherland Highlanders) Light Anti-Aircraft Regiment, Royal Artillery

 3rd Anti-Aircraft Brigade
 3rd Anti-Aircraft Brigade Headquarters and Signals Section, Royal Signals
 2nd Anti-Aircraft Regiment Royal Artillery
 8th (Belfast) Anti-Aircraft Regiment, Royal Artillery
 79th (Hertfordshire Yeomanry) Anti-Aircraft Regiment, Royal Artillery
 37th (Tyne Electrical Engineers) Searchlight Regiment, Royal Artillery
 4th Light Anti-Aircraft Battery, Royal Artillery
 174th Light Anti-Aircraft Battery, Royal Artillery

 4th Anti-Aircraft Brigade
 4th Anti-Aircraft Brigade Headquarters and Signals Section, Royal Signals
 4th Anti-Aircraft Regiment, Royal Artillery
 52nd (East Lancashire) Light Anti-Aircraft Regiment, Royal Artillery – from I Corps

 5th Searchlight Brigade
 5th Anti-Aircraft Brigade Headquarters and Signals Section, Royal Signals
 1st Searchlight Regiment, Royal Artillery
 2nd Searchlight Regiment, Royal Artillery
 3rd (Ulster) Searchlight Regiment, Royal Artillery

Commander Royal Engineers 
Major-General Ridley Pakenham Pakenham-Walsh
 Direct reports
 100th (Monmouthshire) Army Field Company, Royal Monmouthshire Royal Engineers
 101st (Monmouthshire) Army Field Company, Royal Monmouthshire Royal Engineers
 216th (1st London) Army Field Company, Royal Engineers
 228th (West Riding) Field Company, Royal Engineers
 242nd (Lowland) Field Company, Royal Engineers
 223rd (2nd London) Field Park Company, Royal Engineers
 109th Workshop and Park Company, Royal Engineers
 1st Army Troops Company, Royal Engineers
 2nd Army Troops Company, Royal Engineers
 19th Army Field Survey Company, Royal Engineers
 119th Road Construction Company, Royal Engineers
 135th Excavator Company, Royal Engineers
 1st Boring Section, Royal Engineers
 2nd Boring Section, Royal Engineers
 1st Anti-Gas Laboratory, Royal Engineers
 58th (Chemical Warfare) Company, Royal Engineers
 61st (Chemical Warfare) Company, Royal Engineers
 62nd (Chemical Warfare) Company, Royal Engineers
 1st Tunnelling Group, Royal Engineers
 170th Tunnelling Company, Royal Engineers
 171st Tunnelling Company, Royal Engineers
 172nd Tunnelling Company, Royal Engineers
 173rd Tunnelling Company, Royal Engineers

5th Infantry Division

Major-General Harold Franklyn [nb 1] [nb 1] [nb 1] [nb 1] [nb 1] [nb 1]

 Division-level units
 5th Infantry Division Headquarters and Employment Platoon, Royal Pioneer Corps 
 5th Infantry Divisional Field Cash Office, Royal Army Pay Corps
 5th Divisional Signals, Royal Signals
 9th Battalion, The Manchester Regiment
 5th Infantry Divisional Field Post Office, Royal Engineers
 9th Mobile Bath Unit, Royal Army Ordnance Corps
 5th Infantry Divisional Provost Company, Corps of Military Police
 13th Infantry Brigade
 13th Infantry Brigade Headquarters and Signals Section, Royal Signals
 2nd Battalion, The Scottish (Cameronian) Rifles
 2nd Battalion, The Royal Inniskilling Fusiliers
 2nd Battalion, The Wiltshire Regiment
 13th Infantry Brigade Anti-Tank Company
 17th Infantry Brigade
 17th Infantry Brigade Headquarters and Signals Section, Royal Signals
 2nd Battalion, The Royal Scots Fusiliers
 2nd Battalion, The Northamptonshire Regiment
 6th (Morayshire) Battalion, The Duke of Albany's Seaforth Highlanders (The Ross-shire Buffs)
 17th Infantry Brigade Anti-Tank Company

 Commander Royal Artillery, 5th Division
 Commander Royal Artillery, 5th Division HQ
 9th Field Regiment, Royal Artillery
 91st (4th London) Field Regiment, Royal Artillery
 92nd (5th London) Field Regiment, Royal Artillery
 52nd (6th London) Anti-Tank Regiment, Royal Artillery
 Commander Royal Engineers, 5th Division
 Commander Royal Engineers, 5th Division HQ
 38th Field Company, Royal Engineers
 245th (Welsh) Field Company, Royal Engineers
 252nd (West Lancashire) Field Company, Royal Engineers
 254th (West Lancashire) Field Park Company, Royal Engineers
 Commander Royal Army Service Corps, 5th Division
 5th Infantry Divisional Royal Army Service Corps HQ
 5th Infantry Divisional Ammunition Company, Royal Army Service Corps
 5th Infantry Divisional Petrol Company, Royal Army Service Corps
 5th Infantry Divisional Supply Column, Royal Army Service Corps
 Commander Royal Army Medical Corps, 5th Division
 5th Infantry Divisional Royal Army Medical Corps HQ
 141st (County of London) Field Ambulance, Royal Army Medical Corps
 158th (Welsh) Field Ambulance, Royal Army Medical Corps
 164th (West Lancashire) Field Ambulance, Royal Army Medical Corps
 24th Field Hygiene Section, Royal Army Medical Corps

I Corps

Lieutenant-General Michael Barker

 Corps-level units
 I Corps Signals, Royal Corps of Signals
 I Corps Postal Unit, Royal Engineers
 4th (The Earl of Chester's) Battalion, Cheshire Regiment (Machine-Guns)
 2nd Battalion, Manchester Regiment (Machine-Guns)
 I Corps Troops Ammunition Column, Royal Army Service Corps
 I Corps Ammunition Company, Royal Army Service Corps
 I Corps Supply Column, Royal Army Service Corps
 I Corps Petrol Company, Royal Army Service Corps
 1st Reception Camp
 1st Storage Unit
 2nd Storage Unit
 3rd Storage Unit
 8th Storage Unit

 Corps Headquarters Troop, I Corps
 1st Field Cash Office, Royal Army Pay Corps
 2nd Field Cash Office, Royal Army Pay Corps
 3rd Field Cash Office, Royal Army Pay Corps
 48th Field Cash Office, Royal Army Pay Corps

I Corps Troops, Royal Engineers

 Direct reports
 102nd (London) Army Field Company, Royal Engineers
 107th (North Riding) Army Field Company, Royal Engineers
 221st (2nd London) Field Company, Royal Engineers
 105th Army Field Park Company, Royal Engineers
 13th Corps Field Survey Company, Royal Engineers
 1st Troop Carrying Company, Royal Army Service Corps
 3rd Troop Carrying Company, Royal Army Service Corps
 Cypriot Pack Transportation Company, Royal Army Service Corps
 5th Section from 1st Personnel Company, Royal Army Service Corps
 6th Section from 1st Personnel Company, Royal Army Service Corps
 32nd Section from 2nd Personnel Company, Royal Army Service Corps
 1st Motor Ambulance Convoy, Royal Army Service Corps
 1st Ordnance Field Park, Royal Army Ordnance Corps
 1st Army Field Workshop, Royal Army Ordnance Corps
 2nd Army Field Workshop, Royal Army Ordnance Corps
 11th Army Field Workshop, Royal Army Ordnance Corps
 7th Mobile Bath Unit, Royal Army Ordnance Corps
 13th Field Ambulance, Royal Army Medical Corps
 6th Field Hygiene Section, Royal Army Medical Corps
 1st Advanced Medical Stores Depôt, Royal Army Medical Corps
 1st Mobile Hygiene Laboratory, Royal Army Medical Corps
 1st Mobile Bacteriological Laboratory, Royal Army Medical Corps
 1st Casualty Clearing Station, Royal Army Medical Corps
 8th Casualty Clearing Station, Royal Army Medical Corps
 102nd Provost Company, Corps of Military Police
 1st General Construction Group, Royal Engineers
 660th General Construction Company, Royal Engineers
 661st General Construction Company, Royal Engineers
 667th General Construction Company, Royal Engineers
 223rd (2nd London) Field Park Company, Royal Engineers
 12th Group, Auxiliary Military Pioneer Corps
 44th Company, Auxiliary Military Pioneer Corps
 45th Company, Auxiliary Military Pioneer Corps
 61st Company, Auxiliary Military Pioneer Corps

I Corps Artillery Troops
 1st Survey Regiment, Royal Artillery
 1st General Headquarters Artillery Company, Royal Army Service Corps
 I Corps Commander Royal Artillery
 Commander Corps Artillery Royal Artillery, I Corps
 115th (North Midland) Field Regiment, Royal Artillery
 140th (5th London) Field Regiment, Royal Artillery
 1st Medium Regiment, Royal Artillery
 61st (Caernarvon & Denbigh Yeomanry) Medium Regiment, Royal Artillery
 52nd (East Lancashire) Light Anti-Aircraft Regiment, Royal Artillery
 I Corps Commander Medium Artillery
 Commander Corps Medium Artillery, I Corps
 27th Field Regiment, Royal Artillery
 98th (Surrey and Sussex Yeomanry) Field Regiment, Royal Artillery
 3rd Medium Regiment, Royal Artillery
 5th Medium Regiment, Royal Artillery
 63rd (Highland) Medium Regiment, Royal Artillery
 1st Heavy Regiment, Royal Artillery
 3rd Super-Heavy Battery, Royal Artillery

1st Infantry Division 

Major-General Harold Rupert Leofric George Alexander

  Division-level units
 1st Infantry Division Headquarters and Employment Platoon
 1st Infantry Divisional Field Cash Office, Royal Army Pay Corps
 1st Divisional Signals, Royal Corps of Signals
 13th/18th Royal Hussars
 2nd Battalion, Cheshire Regiment (Machine-Guns)
 4th (City of Aberdeen) Battalion, Gordon Highlanders (Machine-Guns)
 1st Infantry Divisional Field Post Office, Royal Engineers
 1st Mobile Bath Unit, Royal Army Ordnance Corps
 1st Company, Corps of Military Police
 1st (Guards) Infantry Brigade
 1st (Guards) Infantry Brigade Headquarters and Signals Section, Royal Signals
 3rd Battalion, Grenadier Guards
 2nd Battalion, Coldstream Guards
 2nd Battalion, Hampshire Regiment
 1st Guards Brigade Anti-Tank Company
 2nd Infantry Brigade
 2nd Infantry Brigade Headquarters and Signals Section, Royal Signals
 1st Battalion, Loyal North Lancashire Regiment
 2nd Battalion, North Staffordshire Regiment (Prince of Wales's)
 6th (Banffshire) Battalion, Gordon Highlanders
 2nd Infantry Brigade Anti-Tank Company
 3rd Infantry Brigade
 3rd Infantry Brigade Headquarters and Signals Section, Royal Signals
 1st Battalion, Duke of Wellington's Regiment (West Riding)
 2nd Battalion, Sherwood Foresters
 1st Battalion, King's Shropshire Light Infantry
 3rd Infantry Brigade Anti-Tank Company

 Commander Royal Artillery, 1st Division
 1st Infantry Divisional Artillery HQ
 2nd Field Regiment, Royal Artillery
 19th Field Regiment, Royal Artillery
 67th (South Midland) Field Regiment, Royal Artillery
 21st Anti-Tank Regiment, Royal Artillery
 Commander Royal Engineers, 1st Division
 1st Infantry Divisional Royal Engineers HQ
 23rd Field Company, Royal Engineers
 238th (County of Renfrewshire, Highland) Field Company, Royal Engineers
 248th (East Anglian) Field Company, Royal Engineers
 6th Field Park Company, Royal Engineers
 Commander Royal Army Service Corps, 1st Division
 1st Infantry Divisional Royal Army Service Corps HQ
 1st Infantry Divisional Ammunition Company, Royal Army Service Corps
 1st Infantry Divisional Petrol Company, Royal Army Service Corps
 1st Infantry Divisional Supply Column, Royal Army Service Corps
 Commander Royal Army Medical Corps, 1st Division
 1st Infantry Divisional Royal Army Medical Corps HQ
 1st Field Ambulance, Royal Army Medical Corps
 2nd Field Ambulance, Royal Army Medical Corps
 3rd Field Ambulance, Royal Army Medical Corps
 1st Field Hygiene Section, Royal Army Medical Corps

2nd Infantry Division 

Major-General Henry Charles Loyd

 Division-level units
 2nd Infantry Division Headquarters and Employment Platoon 
 2nd Infantry Divisional Field Cash Office, Royal Army Pay Corps
 2nd Divisional Signals, Royal Corps of Signals
 4th/7th Royal Dragoon Guards
 2nd Battalion, Manchester Regiment (Machine-Guns)
 2nd Infantry Divisional Field Post Office, Royal Engineers
 2nd Mobile Bath Unit, Royal Army Ordnance Corps
 2nd Company, Corps of Military Police
 4th Infantry Brigade
 4th Infantry Brigade Headquarters and Signals Section, Royal Signals
 1st Battalion, Royal Scots
 2nd Battalion, Royal Norfolk Regiment
 8th Battalion, Lancashire Fusiliers
 4th Infantry Brigade Anti-Tank Company
 5th Infantry Brigade
 5th Infantry Brigade Headquarters and Signals Section, Royal Signals
 7th Battalion, Worcestershire Regiment
 2nd Battalion, Dorsetshire Regiment
 1st Battalion, Queen's Own Cameron Highlanders
 5th Infantry Brigade Anti-Tank Company
 6th Infantry Brigade
 6th Infantry Brigade Headquarters and Signals Section, Royal Signals
 1st Battalion, Royal Welch Fusiliers
 1st Battalion, Royal Berkshire Regiment (Princess Charlotte of Wales's)
 2nd Battalion, Durham Light Infantry
 6th Infantry Brigade Anti-Tank Company

 Commander Royal Artillery, 2nd Division
 2nd Infantry Divisional Royal Artillery HQ
 10th Field Regiment, Royal Artillery
 16th Field Regiment, Royal Artillery
 99th (Buckinghamshire Yeomanry) Field Regiment, Royal Artillery
 13th Anti-Tank Regiment, Royal Artillery
 Commander Royal Engineers, 2nd Division
 2nd Infantry Divisional Royal Engineers HQ
 5th Field Company, Royal Engineers
 208th (Sussex) Field Company, Royal Engineers
 506th Field Company, Royal Engineers
 21st Field Park Company, Royal Engineers
 Commander Royal Army Service Corps, 2nd Division
 2nd Infantry Divisional Royal Army Service Corps HQ
 2nd Infantry Divisional Ammunition Company, Royal Army Service Corps
 2nd Infantry Divisional Petrol Company, Royal Army Service Corps
 2nd Infantry Divisional Supply Column, Royal Army Service Corps
 Commander Royal Army Medical Corps, 2nd Division
 2nd Infantry Divisional Royal Army Medical Corps HQ
 4th Field Ambulance, Royal Army Medical Corps
 5th Field Ambulance, Royal Army Medical Corps
 6th Field Ambulance, Royal Army Medical Corps
 2nd Field Hygiene Section, Royal Army Medical Corps

48th (South Midland) Infantry Division 

Major-General Augustus Francis Andrew Nicol Thorne

 Division-level units
 48th (South Midland) Infantry Division Headquarters and Employment Platoon
 48th (South Midland) Divisional Field Cash Office, Royal Army Pay Corps
 48th (South Midland) Divisional Signals, Royal Corps of Signals
 4th Battalion, Cheshire Regiment
 48th (South Midland) Divisional Field Post Office, Royal Engineers
 14th Mobile Bath Unit, Royal Army Ordnance Corps
 48th (South Midland) Divisional Provost Company, Corps of Military Police
 143rd Infantry Brigade
 143rd Infantry Brigade Headquarters and Signals Section, Royal Signals
 1st Battalion, Oxfordshire and Buckinghamshire Light Infantry
 7th Battalion, Royal Warwickshire Regiment
 8th Battalion, The Royal Warwickshire Regiment
 143rd Infantry Brigade Anti-Tank Company
 144th Infantry Brigade
 144th Infantry Brigade Headquarters and Signals Section, Royal Signals
 2nd Battalion, Royal Warwickshire Regiment
 5th Battalion, Gloucestershire Regiment
 8th Battalion, Worcestershire Regiment
 144th Infantry Brigade Anti-Tank Company
 145th Infantry Brigade
 145th Infantry Brigade Headquarters and Signals Section, Royal Signals
 2nd Battalion, Gloucestershire Regiment
 1st (Buckinghamshire) Battalion, Oxfordshire and Buckinghamshire Light Infantry
 4th Battalion, Oxfordshire and Buckinghamshire Light Infantry
 145th Infantry Brigade Anti-Tank Company

 Commander Royal Artillery, 48th Division
 48th (South Midland) Divisional Royal Artillery HQ
 18th Field Regiment, Royal Artillery
 24th Field Regiment, Royal Artillery
 68th (South Midland) Field Regiment, Royal Artillery
 53rd (Worcestershire and Oxfordshire Yeomanry) Anti-Tank Regiment, Royal Artillery
 Commander Royal Engineers, 48th Division
 48th (South Midland) Divisional Royal Engineers HQ
 9th Field Company, Royal Engineers
 224th (South Midland) Field Company, Royal Engineers
 226th (South Midland) Field Company, Royal Engineers
 227th (South Midland) Field Park Company, Royal Engineers
 Commander Royal Army Service Corps, 48th Division
 48th (South Midland) Infantry Divisional Royal Army Service Corps HQ
 48th (South Midland) Infantry Divisional Ammunition Company, Royal Army Service Corps
 48th (South Midland) Infantry Divisional Petrol Company, Royal Army Service Corps
 48th (South Midland) Infantry Divisional Supply Column, Royal Army Service Corps
 Commander Royal Army Medical Corps, 48th Division
 48th (South Midland) Infantry Divisional Royal Army Medical Corps HQ
 143rd (South Midland) Field Ambulance, Royal Army Medical Corps
 144th (South Midland) Field Ambulance, Royal Army Medical Corps
 145th (South Midland) Field Ambulance, Royal Army Medical Corps
 12th Field Hygiene Section, Royal Army Medical Corps

II Corps

Lieutenant-General Alan Brooke

 Corps-level units
 4th Field Cash Office, Royal Army Pay Corps
 5th, Royal Army Pay Corps
 6th, Royal Army Pay Corps
 II Corps Signals, Royal Signals
 2nd Battalion, Royal Northumberland Fusiliers (Machine-Guns)
 2nd Battalion, Middlesex Regiment (Duke of Cambridge's Own) (Machine-Guns)
 7th Battalion, Middlesex Regiment (Duke of Cambridge's Own) (Machine-Guns)
 II Corps Postal Unit, Royal Engineers
 II Corps Troops Ammunition Column, Royal Army Service Corps
 II Corps Ammunition Company, Royal Army Service Corps
 II Corps Supply Column, Royal Army Service Corps
 II Corps Petrol Company, Royal Army Service Corps
 2nd Ambulance Car Company, Royal Army Service Corps
 3rd Section from 1st Personnel Company, Royal Army Service Corps
 18th Section from 2nd Personnel Company, Royal Army Service Corps
 33rd Section from 2nd Personnel Company, Royal Army Service Corps
 3rd Ordnance Field Park, Royal Army Ordnance Corps
 2nd Army Field Workshop, Royal Army Ordnance Corps
 8th Army Field Workshop, Royal Army Ordnance Corps
 14th Army Field Workshop, Royal Army Ordnance Corps
 6th Mobile Bath Unit, Royal Army Ordnance Corps
 14th Field Ambulance, Royal Army Medical Corps
 7th Field Hygiene Section, Royal Army Medical Corps
 3rd Advanced Medical Stores Depot, Royal Army Medical Corps
 2nd Mobile Hygiene Laboratory, Royal Army Medical Corps
 2nd Mobile Bacteriological Laboratory, Royal Army Medical Corps
 5th Casualty Clearing Station, Royal Army Medical Corps
 6th Casualty Clearing Station, Royal Army Medical Corps
 103rd Provost Company, Royal Military Police
 2nd Reception Camp
 4th Storage Unit
 5th Storage Unit
 6th Storage Unit
 13th Storage Unit

 II Corps Headquarters Troops
 Intelligence Section, Intelligence Corps
 2nd Air Intelligence Section, Intelligence Corps
 8th Air Intelligence Section, Intelligence Corps
 5th Employment Platoon
 4th Field Security Police Section, Royal Military Police
 5th Field Security Police Section, Royal Military Police
 8th Field Security Police Section, Royal Military Police
 12th Field Security Police Section, Royal Military Police
 20th Field Security Police Section, Royal Military Police

II Corps Troops, Royal Engineers

 222nd (2nd London) Army Field Company, Royal Engineers
 234th (Northumbrian) Army Field Company, Royal Engineers
 240th (Lowland) Army Field Company, Royal Engineers
 108th (Essex) Corps Field Park, Royal Engineers
 14th Corps Survey Company, Royal Engineers
 2nd General Construction Group, Royal Engineers
 660th General Construction Company, Royal Engineers
 661st General Construction Company, Royal Engineers
 667th General Construction Company, Royal Engineers
 223rd (2nd London) Field Park Company, Royal Engineers
 11th Group, Auxiliary Military Pioneer Corps
 40th Company, Auxiliary Military Pioneer Corps
 42nd Company, Auxiliary Military Pioneer Corps
 60th Company, Auxiliary Military Pioneer Corps

II Corps Artillery Troops
 2nd Survey Regiment, Royal Artillery
 2nd General Headquarters Artillery Company, Royal Army Service Corps
 II Corps Commander, Royal Artillery
 60th (North Midland) Army Field Regiment, Royal Artillery
 88th (2nd West Lancashire) Army Field Regiment, Royal Artillery
 53rd (London) Medium Regiment, Royal Artillery
 59th (4th West Lancashire) Medium Regiment, Royal Artillery
 53rd (King's Own Yorkshire Light Infantry) Light Anti-Aircraft Regiment, Royal Artillery
 II Corps Commander, Medium Artillery
 2nd Regiment, Royal Horse Artillery (Field)
 32nd Army Field Regiment, Royal Artillery
 2nd Medium Regiment, Royal Artillery
 4th Medium Regiment, Royal Artillery
 58th (Suffolk) Medium Regiment, Royal Artillery
 51st (Lowland) Heavy Regiment, Royal Artillery
 2nd Super Heavy Battery, Royal Artillery

3rd Infantry Division 

Major-General Bernard Montgomery

 Division-level units
 3rd Infantry Division Headquarters and Employment Platoon
 3rd Infantry Divisional Field Cash Office, Royal Army Pay Corps
 3rd Divisional Signals, Royal Corps of Signals
 2nd Battalion, Middlesex Regiment (Duke of Cambridge's Own)
 7th Battalion, Middlesex Regiment (Duke of Cambridge's Own)
 3rd Infantry Divisional Field Post Office, Royal Engineers
 3rd Mobile Bath Unit, Royal Army Ordnance Corps
 3rd Infantry Divisional Provost Company, Corps of Military Police
 7th (Guards) Infantry Brigade
 7th (Guards) Infantry Brigade Headquarters and Signal Section, Royal Signals
 1st Battalion, Grenadier Guards
 2nd Battalion, Grenadier Guards
 1st Battalion, Coldstream Guards
 7th (Guards) Infantry Brigade Anti-Tank Company
 8th Infantry Brigade
 8th Infantry Brigade Headquarters and Signal Section, Royal Signals
 1st Battalion, Suffolk Regiment
 2nd Battalion, East Yorkshire Regiment (Duke of York's Own)
 4th Battalion, Royal Berkshire Regiment (Princess Charlotte of Wales's)
 8th Infantry Brigade Anti-Tank Company
 9th Infantry Brigade
 9th Infantry Brigade Headquarters and Signal Section, Royal Signals
 2nd Battalion, Lincolnshire Regiment
 1st Battalion, King's Own Scottish Borderers
 2nd Battalion, Royal Ulster Rifles
 9th Infantry Brigade Anti-Tank Company

 Commander Royal Artillery, 3rd Division
 3rd Infantry Division Royal Artillery Headquarters
 7th Field Regiment, Royal Artillery
 33rd Field Regiment, Royal Artillery
 76th (Highland) Field Regiment, Royal Artillery
 20th Anti-Tank Regiment, Royal Artillery
 Commander Royal Engineers, 3rd Division
 Headquarters, 3rd Infantry Divisional Royal Engineers
 17th Field Company, Royal Engineers
 246th (Welsh) Field Company, Royal Engineers
 253rd (West Lancashire) Field Company, Royal Engineers
 15th Field Park Company, Royal Engineers
 Commander Royal Army Service Corps, 3rd Division
 Headquarters, 3rd Infantry Divisional Royal Army Service Corps
 3rd Infantry Divisional, Royal Army Service Corps
 3rd Infantry Divisional Ammunition Company, Royal Army Service Corps
 3rd Infantry Divisional Petrol Company, Royal Army Service Corps
 3rd Infantry Divisional Supply Column, Royal Army Service Corps
 Commander Royal Army Medical Corps, 3rd Division
 Headquarters, 3rd Infantry Divisional Royal Army Medical Corps
 7th Field Ambulance, Royal Army Medical Corps
 8th Field Ambulance, Royal Army Medical Corps
 9th Field Ambulance, Royal Army Medical Corps
 3rd Field Hygiene Section, Royal Army Medical Corps

4th Infantry Division 

Major-General Dudley Johnson

 Division-level units
 4th Infantry Division Headquarters and Employment Platoon
 4th Infantry Divisional Field Cash Office, Royal Army Pay Corps
 4th Divisional Signals, Royal Corps of Signals
 2nd Battalion, Royal Northumberland Fusiliers
 4th Infantry Divisional Field Post Office, Royal Engineers
 13th Mobile Bath Unit, Royal Army Medical Corps
 4th Infantry Divisional Provost Company, Corps of Military Police
 10th Infantry Brigade
 10th Infantry Brigade Headquarters and Signals Section, Royal Signals
 2nd Battalion, Bedfordshire and Hertfordshire Regiment
 6th Battalion, East Surrey Regiment
 2nd Battalion, Duke of Cornwall's Light Infantry
 10th Infantry Brigade Anti-Tank Company
 11th Infantry Brigade
 11th Infantry Brigade Headquarters and Signals Section, Royal Signals
 2nd Battalion, Lancashire Fusiliers
 1st Battalion, East Surrey Regiment
 5th (Huntingdonshire) Battalion, Northamptonshire Regiment
 11th Infantry Brigade Anti-Tank Company
 12th Infantry Brigade
 12th Infantry Brigade Headquarters and Signals Section, Royal Signals
 2nd Battalion, Royal Fusiliers (City of London Regiment)
 1st Battalion, The South Lancashire Regiment
 6th (Perthshire) Battalion, The Black Watch (Royal Highland Regiment)
 12th Infantry Brigade Anti-Tank Company

 Commander Royal Artillery, 4th Division
 4th Infantry Divisional Royal Artillery HQ
 22nd Field Regiment, Royal Artillery
 30th Field Regiment, Royal Artillery
 77th (Highland) Field Regiment, Royal Artillery
 14th Anti-Tank Regiment, Royal Artillery
 Commander Royal Engineers, 4th Division
 4th Infantry Divisional Royal Engineers HQ
 7th Field Company, Royal Engineers
 59th Field Company, Royal Engineers
 225th (South Midland) Field Company, Royal Engineers
 18th Field Park Company, Royal Engineers
 Commander Royal Army Service Corps, 4th Division
 4th Infantry Divisional Royal Army Service Corps HQ
 4th Infantry Divisional Ammunition Company, Royal Army Service Corps
 4th Infantry Divisional Petrol Company, Royal Army Service Corps
 4th Infantry Divisional Supply Column, Royal Army Service Corps
 Commander Royal Army Medical Corps, 4th Division
 4th Infantry Divisional Royal Army Medical Corps HQ
 10th Field Ambulance, Royal Army Medical Corps
 11th Field Ambulance, Royal Army Medical Corps
 12th Field Ambulance, Royal Army Medical Corps
 4th Field Hygiene Section, Royal Army Medical Corps

50th (Northumbrian) Motor Infantry Division 

Major-General Giffard Martel

 Division-level units
 50th Infantry Division Headquarters and Employment Platoon 
 50th (Northumbrian) Infantry Divisional Field Cash Office, Royal Army Pay Corps
 50th (Northumbrian) Divisional Signals, Royal Signals
 4th Battalion, Royal Northumberland Fusiliers—Divisional motorcycle reconnaissance unit
 50th (Northumbrian) Infantry Divisional Field Post Office, Royal Engineers
 unknown #, Royal Army Ordnance Corps
 50th (Northumbrian) Infantry Divisional Provost Company, Corps of Military Police
 25th Infantry Brigade
 25th Infantry Brigade Headquarters and Signals Section, Royal Signals
 2nd Battalion, Essex Regiment
 1st Battalion, Royal Irish Fusiliers
 7th (Southwark) Battalion, Queen's Royal West Surrey Regiment
 150th Infantry Brigade
 150th Infantry Brigade Headquarters and Signals Section, Royal Signals
 4th Battalion, East Yorkshire Regiment (Duke of York's Own)
 4th Battalion, Alexandra, Princess of Wales Own Yorkshire Regiment (Green Howards)
 5th Battalion, Alexandra, Princess of Wales Own Yorkshire Regiment (Green Howards)
 151st Infantry Brigade
 151st Infantry Brigade Headquarters and Signals Section, Royal Signals
 6th Battalion, Durham Light Infantry
 8th Battalion, Durham Light Infantry
 9th Battalion, Durham Light Infantry

 Commander Royal Artillery, 50th Division
 50th (Northumbrian) Infantry Divisional Royal Artillery HQ
 72nd (Northumbrian) Field Regiment, Royal Artillery
 74th (Northumbrian) Field Regiment, Royal Artillery
 65th (Norfolk Yeomanry) Anti-Tank Regiment, Royal Artillery
 Commander Royal Engineers, 50th Division
 50th (Northumbrian) Divisional Engineers HQ
 232nd (Northumbrian) Field Company, Royal Engineers
 505th Field Company, Royal Engineers
 235th (Northumbrian) Field Park Company, Royal Engineers
 Commander Royal Army Service Corps, 50th Division
 50th (Northumbrian) Infantry Divisional Royal Army Service Corps HQ
 50th (Northumbrian) Infantry Divisional Ammunition Company, Royal Army Service Corps
 50th (Northumbrian) Infantry Divisional Petrol Company, Royal Army Service Corps
 50th (Northumbrian) Infantry Divisional Supply Column, Royal Army Service Corps
 Commander Royal Army Medical Corps, 50th Division
 50th (Northumbrian) Infantry Divisional Royal Army Medical Corps HQ
 149th (Northumbrian) Field Ambulance, Royal Army Medical Corps
 150th (Northumbrian) Field Ambulance, Royal Army Medical Corps
 183rd Field Ambulance, Royal Army Medical Corps
 22nd Field Hygiene Section, Royal Army Medical Corps

III Corps

Lieutenant-General Sir Ronald Forbes Adam

III Corps Headquarters, Troops 
 III Corps Cash Office, Royal Army Pay Corps
 44th Field Cash Office, Royal Army Pay Corps
 III Corps Signals, Royal Corps of Signals
 1/9th Battalion, The Manchester Regiment (Machine-Guns)
 III Corps Postal Unit, Royal Engineers
 78th Company, Auxiliary Military Pioneer Corps
 III Corps Troops Ammunition Column, Royal Army Service Corps
 III Corps Ammunition Company, Royal Army Service Corps
 III Corps Supply Column, Royal Army Service Corps
 III Corps Petrol Company, Royal Army Service Corps
 2nd Ambulance Car Convoy, Royal Army Service Corps
 4th Ordnance Field Park, Royal Army Ordnance Corps
 4th Army Field Workshop, Royal Army Ordnance Corps
 9th Army Field Workshop, Royal Army Ordnance Corps
 15th Mobile Bath Unit, Royal Army Ordnance Corps
 159th Field Ambulance, Royal Army Medical Corps
 23rd Field Hygiene Section, Royal Army Medical Corps
 10th Casualty Clearing Station, Royal Army Medical Corps
 12th Casualty Clearing Station, Royal Army Medical Corps
 104th Provost Company, Corps of Military Police
 3rd Reception Camp
 7th Storage Unit
 9th Storage Unit
 12th Storage Unit

Commander Royal Engineers, III Corps 
 214th (North Midland) Army Field Company, Royal Engineers
 217th (1st London) Army Field Company, Royal Engineers
 293rd Corps Field Park Company, Royal Engineers
 668th General Construction Company, Royal Engineers
 514th Corps Field Survey Company, Royal Engineers

Commander Royal Artillery, III Corps 
 3rd Survey Regiment, Royal Artillery
 3rd General Headquarters Artillery Company, Royal Army Service Corps
 4th General Headquarters Artillery Company, Royal Army Service Corps

 Commander Royal Artillery, III Corps
 III Corps Royal Artillery HQ
 5th Regiment, Royal Horse Artillery (Field)
 97th (Kent Yeomanry) Field Regiment, Royal Artillery
 56th (Highland) Medium Regiment, Royal Artillery
 54th (Argyll and Sutherland Highlanders) Light Anti-Aircraft Regiment, Royal Artillery

 Commander Medium Artillery, III Corps
 III Corps Medium Artillery HQ
 139th (4th London) Army Field Regiment, Royal Artillery
 65th (8th London) Field Regiment, Royal Artillery
 69th (West Riding) Field Regiment, Royal Artillery
 52nd (Bedfordshire Yeomanry) Heavy Regiment, Royal Artillery

42nd (East Lancashire) Infantry Division 

Major-General William Holmes

 Division-level units
 42nd (East Lancashire) Infantry Division Headquarters and Employment Platoon 
 42nd (East Lancashire) Infantry Divisional Field Cash Office, Royal Army Pay Corps
 42nd (East Lancashire) Divisional Signals, Royal Signals
 7th Battalion, The Cheshire Regiment
 42nd (East Lancashire) Infantry Divisional Field Post Office, Royal Engineers
 10th Mobile Bath Unit, Royal Army Ordnance Corps
 42nd (East Lancashire) Infantry Divisional Provost Company, Corps of Military Police
 125th Infantry Brigade
 125th Infantry Brigade Headquarters and Signals Section, Royal Signals
 5th Battalion, The Lancashire Fusiliers
 6th Battalion, The Lancashire Fusiliers
 1st Battalion, The Border Regiment
 125th Infantry Brigade Anti-Tank Company
 126th Infantry Brigade
 126th Infantry Brigade Headquarters and Signals Section, Royal Signals
 5th Battalion, The King's Own Royal Lancaster Regiment
 1st Battalion, The East Lancashire Regiment
 5th (Cumberland) Battalion, The Border Regiment
 126th Infantry Brigade Anti-Tank Company
 127th Infantry Brigade
 127th Infantry Brigade Headquarters and Signals Section, Royal Signals
 4th Battalion, The East Lancashire Regiment
 5th Battalion, The Manchester Regiment
 1st Battalion The Highland Light Infantry
 127th Infantry Brigade Anti-Tank Company

 Commander Royal Artillery, 42nd Division
 42nd (East Lancashire) Infantry Divisional Royal Artillery HQ
 52nd (Manchester) Field Regiment, Royal Artillery
 53rd (Bolton) Field Regiment, Royal Artillery
 56th (King's Own) Anti-Tank Regiment, Royal Artillery
 Commander Royal Engineers, 42nd Division
 42nd (East Lancashire) Divisional Engineers HQ
 200th (East Lancashire) Field Company, Royal Engineers
 201st (East Lancashire) Field Company, Royal Engineers
 250th (East Anglian) Field Company, Royal Engineers
 203rd (East Lancashire) Field Park Company, Royal Engineers
 Commander Royal Army Service Corps, 42nd Division
 42nd (East Lancashire) Infantry Divisional Royal Army Service Corps HQ
 42nd (East Lancashire) Infantry Divisional Ammunition Company, Royal Army Service Corps
 42nd (East Lancashire) Infantry Divisional Petrol Company, Royal Army Service Corps
 42nd (East Lancashire) Infantry Divisional Supply Column, Royal Army Service Corps
 Commander Royal Army Medical Corps, 42nd Division
 42nd (East Lancashire) Infantry Divisional Royal Army Medical Corps HQ
 125th (East Lancashire) Field Ambulance, Royal Army Medical Corps
 126th (East Lancashire) Field Ambulance, Royal Army Medical Corps
 127th (East Lancashire) Field Ambulance, Royal Army Medical Corps
 20th Field Hygiene Section, Royal Army Medical Corps

44th (Home Counties) Infantry Division 

Major-General Edmund Osborne

 Division-level units
 44th (Home Counties) Infantry Division Headquarters and Employment Platoon 
 44th (Home Counties) Infantry Divisional Field Cash Office, Royal Army Pay Corps
 44th (Home Counties) Infantry Divisional Signals, Royal Corps of Signals
 8th Battalion, The Duke of Cambridge's Own Middlesex Regiment
 44th (Home Counties) Infantry Divisional Field Post Office, Royal Engineers
 11th Mobile Bath Unit, Royal Army Ordnance Corps
 44th (Home Counties) Infantry Divisional Provost Company, Corps of Military Police
 131st Infantry Brigade
 131st Infantry Brigade Headquarters and Signals Section, Royal Signals
 2nd Battalion, The Royal East Kent Regiment (Buffs)
 5th Battalion, The Queen's Royal West Surrey Regiment
 6th (Bermondsey) Battalion, The Queen's Royal West Surrey Regiment
 131st Infantry Brigade Anti-Tank Company
 132nd Infantry Brigade
 132nd Infantry Brigade Headquarters and Signals Section, Royal Signals
 1st Battalion, The Queen's Own Royal West Kent Regiment
 4th Battalion, The Queen's Own Royal West Kent Regiment
 5th Battalion, The Queen's Own Royal West Kent Regiment
 132nd Infantry Brigade Anti-Tank Company
 133rd Infantry Brigade
 133rd Infantry Brigade Headquarters and Signals Section, Royal Signals
 2nd Battalion, Royal Sussex Regiment
 4th Battalion, Royal Sussex Regiment
 5th (Cinque Ports) Battalion, Royal Sussex Regiment
 133rd Infantry Brigade Anti-Tank Company

 Commander Royal Artillery, 44th Division
 44th (Home Counties) Infantry Divisional Royal Artillery HQ
 57th (Home Counties) Field Regiment, Royal Artillery
 58th (Sussex) Field Regiment, Royal Artillery
 65th (8th London) Field Regiment, Royal Artillery
 57th (East Surrey) Anti-Tank Regiment, Royal Artillery
 Commander Royal Engineers, 44th Division
 44th (Home Counties) Divisional Engineers HQ
 11th Field Company, Royal Engineers
 209th (Sussex) Field Company, Royal Engineers
 210th (Sussex) Field Company, Royal Engineers
 211th (Sussex) Field Park Company, Royal Engineers
 Commander Royal Army Service Corps, 44th Division
 44th (Home Counties) Infantry Divisional Royal Army Service Corps HQ
 44th (Home Counties) Infantry Divisional Ammunition Company, Royal Army Service Corps
 44th (Home Counties) Infantry Divisional Petrol Company, Royal Army Service Corps
 44th (Home Counties) Infantry Divisional Supply Column, Royal Army Service Corps
 Commander Royal Army Medical Corps, 44th Division
 44th (Home Counties) Infantry Divisional Royal Army Medical Corps HQ
 131st (Home Counties) Field Ambulance, Royal Army Medical Corps
 132nd (Home Counties) Field Ambulance, Royal Army Medical Corps
 133rd (Home Counties) Field Ambulance, Royal Army Medical Corps
 14th Field Hygiene Section, Royal Army Medical Corps

Saar Force
Major-General Victor Fortune

On 10 May 1940, this force, which was really just the 51st Division reinforced by various small units, was part of the Colonial Army Corps of the French Third Army in front of the Maginot Line.

Units attached to the 51st (Highland) Infantry Division in April 1940 to form Saar Force
 Lothians and Border Horse
 7th Battalion The Northumberland Fusiliers (Machine-Guns)
 1st Battalion Princess Louise's Kensington Regiment (Machine-Guns)
 7th Battalion The Royal Norfolk Regiment (Pioneers)
 6th Battalion The Royal Scots Fusiliers (Pioneers)
 Sound Ranging and Survey Troop - detached from 3rd Survey Regiment RA
 1st Regiment Royal Horse Artillery (Field)
 51st (Midland) Medium Regiment Royal Artillery
 385/97 Army Field Battery Royal Artillery
 213th (North Midland) Army Field Company Royal Engineers
 Topographic Section from 19th Army Field Survey Company Royal Engineers
 22nd Animal Transportation Company Royal Indian Army Service Corps
 Sub-Division from III Corps Ammunition Park Royal Army Service Corps
 F Section from III Corps Petrol Park Royal Army Service Corps
 10th Army Field Workshop Royal Army Ordnance Corps
 10th Salvage Unit

51st (Highland) Infantry Division 

Major-General V. M. Fortune

 Division-level units
 51st (Highland) Infantry Divisional Signals Royal Signals
 51st Postal Unit Royal Engineers
 8th Mobile Bath Unit Royal Army Medical Corps
 51st Provost Company Royal Military Police
 152nd Infantry Brigade
 2nd Battalion, Seaforth Highlanders
 4th Battalion, Seaforth Highlanders
 4th Battalion, Queen's Own Cameron Highlanders
 152nd Infantry Brigade Anti-Tank Company
 153rd Infantry Brigade
 4th Battalion, Black Watch (Royal Highland Regiment)
 1st Battalion, Gordon Highlanders
 5th Battalion, Gordon Highlanders
 153rd Infantry Brigade Anti-Tank Company

 154th Infantry Brigade
 1st Battalion, Black Watch (Royal Highland Regiment)
 7th Battalion, Argyll and Sutherland Highlanders
 8th Battalion, Argyll and Sutherland Highlanders
 154th Infantry Brigade Anti-Tank Company
 Commander Royal Artillery
 17th Field Regiment, Royal Artillery
 23rd Field Regiment, Royal Artillery
 75th (Highland) Field Regiment, Royal Artillery
  10th Army Field Workshop WO 167/1210
 51st (West Highland) Anti-Tank Regiment, Royal Artillery
 Commander Royal Engineers
 26th Field Company, Royal Engineers
 236th (City of Aberdeen, Highland) Field Company, Royal Engineers
 237th (City of Dundee, Highland) Field Company, Royal Engineers
 239th (Highland) Field Park Company, Royal Engineers

Formations undergoing training and performing labour duties

12th (Eastern) Infantry Division

Major-General R. L. Petre

 35th Infantry Brigade
 2/5th Battalion, Queen's Royal Regiment (West Surrey)
 2/6th Battalion, Queen's Royal Regiment (West Surrey)
 2/7th Battalion, Queen's Royal Regiment (West Surrey)
 36th Infantry Brigade
 5th Battalion, Buffs (Royal East Kent Regiment)
 6th Battalion, Queen's Own Royal West Kent Regiment
 7th Battalion, Queen's Own Royal West Kent Regiment

 37th Infantry Brigade
 2/6th Battalion, East Surrey Regiment
 6th Battalion, Royal Sussex Regiment
 7th Battalion, Royal Sussex Regiment
 Commander Royal Engineers
 262nd Field Company, Royal Engineers
 263rd Field Company, Royal Engineers
 264th Field Company, Royal Engineers
 265th Field Park Company, Royal Engineers

23rd (Northumbrian) Division 

Major-General W. N. Herbert

 Divisional Troops
 8th Battalion, Royal Northumberland Fusiliers (Motorcycle Battalion)
 9th Battalion, Royal Northumberland Fusiliers (Machine Gun Battalion)
 69th Infantry Brigade
 5th Battalion, East Yorkshire Regiment
 6th Battalion, Green Howards
 7th Battalion, Green Howards

 70th Infantry Brigade
 10th Battalion, Durham Light Infantry
 11th Battalion, Durham Light Infantry
 1st Battalion, Tyneside Scottish
 Commander Royal Engineers
 233rd Field Company, Royal Engineers
 507th Field Company, Royal Engineers
 508th Field Park Company, Royal Engineers

46th Infantry Division 

Major-General H. O. Curtis

 137th Infantry Brigade
 2/5th Battalion, West Yorkshire Regiment
 2/6th Battalion, Duke of Wellington's Regiment
 2/7th Battalion, Duke of Wellington's Regiment
 138th Infantry Brigade
 6th Battalion, Lincolnshire Regiment
 2/4th Battalion, King's Own Yorkshire Light Infantry
 6th Battalion, York and Lancaster Regiment

 139th Infantry Brigade
 2/5th Battalion, Leicestershire Regiment
 2/5th Battalion, Sherwood Foresters
 9th Battalion, Sherwood Foresters
 Commander Royal Engineers
 270th Field Company, Royal Engineers
 271st Field Company, Royal Engineers
 272nd Field Company, Royal Engineers
 273rd Field Park Company, Royal Engineers

HQ Lines of Communication British Expeditionary Force
Major-General Philip de Fonblanque

 104th Army Troops Company, Royal Engineers
 106th Army Troops Company, Royal Engineers
 110th Army Troops Company, Royal Engineers
 212th Army Troops Company, Royal Engineers
 218th Army Troops Company, Royal Engineers
 4th Battalion, Buffs (Royal East Kent Regiment)
 14th Battalion, Royal Fusiliers
 12th (Garrison) Battalion, Royal Warwickshire Regiment
 4th Battalion, Border Regiment
 1/5th Battalion, Sherwood Foresters

3rd Anti-Aircraft Brigade 

 2nd Anti-Aircraft Regiment, Royal Artillery
 8th (Belfast) Anti-Aircraft Regiment, Royal Artillery
 79th (Hertfordshire Yeomanry) Anti-Aircraft Regiment, Royal Artillery
 4th Light Anti-Aircraft Battery, Royal Artillery

Units arriving in France after 10 May 1940

1st Armoured Division 

Major-General R. Evans

 2nd Armoured Brigade
 2nd Dragoon Guards (Queen's Bays)
 9th Queen's Royal Lancers
 10th Royal Hussars (Prince of Wales's Own)
 3rd Armoured Brigade
 2nd (Battalion) Royal Tank Regiment
 5th (Battalion) Royal Tank Regiment
 30th Infantry Brigade
 3rd (Battalion) Royal Tank Regiment 
 2nd Battalion, King's Royal Rifle Corps
 1st Battalion, Rifle Brigade (Prince Consort's Own)
 1st Battalion, Queen Victoria's Rifles (7th Battalion, King's Royal Rifle Corps) (Motorcycle Battalion)

 20th Guards Brigade Group
 2nd Battalion, Irish Guards
 2nd Battalion, Welsh Guards
 20th Guards Brigade Anti-Tank Company
 1st Support Group
 101st Light Anti-Aircraft/Anti-Tank Regiment, Royal Artillery

Air Component
 Air Vice-Marshal Charles Blount (Data from Jackson 1974 unless indicated.)
 85 Squadron: Hurricane (fighter)
 87 Squadron: Hurricane (fighter)
 607 Squadron: Gladiator (fighter, converting to Hurricane May 1940)
 615 Squadron: Gladiator (fighter, converting to Hurricane May 1940)
 3 Squadron: Hurricane (fighter; reinforcement, May 1940)
 79 Squadron: Hurricane (fighter; reinforcement, May 1940)
 504 Squadron: Hurricane (fighter; reinforcement, May 1940)
 From 22 (Army Co-operation) Group
 81 Squadron: Blenheim I (strategic reconnaissance)
 57 Squadron: Blenheim I (strategic reconnaissance)
 53 Squadron: Blenheim IV (bomber)
 59 Squadron: Blenheim IV (bomber)
 2 Squadron: Lysander (army co-operation)
 4 Squadron: Lysander (army co-operation)
 13 Squadron: Lysander (army co-operation)
 16 Squadron: Lysander (army co-operation)
 26 Squadron: Lysander (army co-operation)

Second Expeditionary Force

The following force was sent to France during the second week of June 1940 in an unsuccessful attempt to form a second British Expeditionary Force. This second formation was to be commanded by Lieutenant-General A. F. Brooke. All units were evacuated in late June 1940, during Operation Aerial.
 1st Canadian Infantry Brigade (from 1st Canadian Infantry Division)
 Royal Canadian Regiment
 Hastings and Prince Edward Regiment
 48th Highlanders of Canada
 1st Field Regiment Royal Canadian Horse Artillery

52nd (Lowland) Infantry Division

Major-General J. S. Drew

 155th Infantry Brigade
 7th/9th (Highlanders) Battalion, Royal Scots
 4th Battalion, King's Own Scottish Borderers
 5th Battalion, King's Own Scottish Borderers
 156th Infantry Brigade
 4th/5th Battalion, Royal Scots Fusiliers
 6th Battalion, Queen's Own Cameron Highlanders
 7th Battalion, Queen's Own Cameron Highlanders
 157th Infantry Brigade
 1st Battalion, Glasgow Highlanders
 5th Battalion, Highland Light Infantry
 6th Battalion, Highland Light Infantry

 Commander Royal Artillery
 70th Field Regiment, Royal Artillery
 71st Field Regiment, Royal Artillery
 78th Field Regiment, Royal Artillery
 54th (Queen's Own Royal Glasgow Yeomanry) Anti-Tank Regiment, Royal Artillery
 Commander Royal Engineers
 202nd Field Company, Royal Engineers
 241st Field Company, Royal Engineers
 554th Field Company, Royal Engineers
 243rd Field Park Company, Royal Engineers

See also

 Order of battle for the Battle of France
 List of British Empire divisions in the Second World War

Notes

Footnotes

References

External links 
 "Documents – France & Norway 1940". British Military History. Retrieved 2019-10-27.
 "British Expeditionary Force, May 1940". niehorster.org. Retrieved 2019-10-26.
 "British Infantry Brigades, 1st thru 215th - 1939-1945" (PDF). web.archive.org. 2016-03-03. Retrieved 2019-10-29.

Field armies of the United Kingdom in World War II
World War II orders of battle
British Army in World War II